Inonge Mutukwa Wina (born 2 April 1941) is a Zambian politician who served as the 13th vice-president of Zambia from 2015 to 2021. She was the first woman to hold the position, which made  her the highest ranking woman in the history of the Zambian government.

Education
Wina attended primary school in Senanga, at the Barotse National School (now Kambule Secondary School) in Mongu. She eventually completed her high school education at Santa Monica High School in Los Angeles, California. She obtained a diploma in social work at Santa Monica College. She also enrolled for a Bachelor of Arts degree at the University of Zambia when it was first opened.

Community service
Wina's involvement in community work dates back to the early 1970s when she volunteered free service to women's movements. She has served on a number of boards of non-governmental organisations and as president of the Young Women's Christian Association, where she was instrumental in promoting women's human rights agenda, resulting in the Zambian government's establishment of the Victim Support Unit under the Zambia Police Service. In 1996, she was elected National Chairperson of the NGO Coordinating Council of Zambia (NGOCC).

In the Red Ribbon Campaign to defend the Zambian Constitution in 2000, Wina led the women's movement. Wina also served on the boards of Refuge Services Zambia, the Zambia Council of Social Services, the University Teaching Hospital, and the University of Zambia Council in the public sector.

Political career
In 2001 Wina was elected as Member of Parliament of Nalolo Constituency as a candidate of the United Party for National Development. She was elected chairperson of a number of portfolio committees, including the Committee on Human Rights Gender and Governance, and Women Parliamentary Caucus.

Wina re-contested her Nalolo seat as a United Liberal Party candidate in the 2006 presidential and general elections. She lost the election and appealed the results to the High Court; the case was initially decided in her favor, but the Supreme Court eventually overturned it. Wina ran for the Nalolo seat again in the 2011 general elections, this time on the Patriotic Front ticket, and won. Wina was included in President Michael Sata's initial 18-member cabinet as Minister of Chiefs and Traditional Affairs. On March 8, 2014, Sata, during the commemoration of International Women's Day, upgraded the gender cabinet division into a full ministry and subsequently appointed Wina as Minister of Gender.

On 26 January 2015, newly elected President Edgar Lungu appointed Wina as Vice President of Zambia. She ran on Lungu's ticket in the 2016 election, becoming the first woman elected as Vice President and resigned from the position ahead of the 2021 general election, announcing her intention to retire.

Personal life
She was married to Arthur Wina, an independence fighter, former minister and academic who died on 3 September 1995. They had three children, two of whom are deceased. Arthur Wina was educated at Munali Secondary School which, in colonial times, was Zambia's principal secondary school for native Zambians. A number of the members of Zambia's first post-Independence cabinet, (including Arthur Wina's brother Sikota), were also educated at Munali.

References

1941 births
Living people
21st-century Zambian women politicians
21st-century Zambian politicians
Gender ministers of Zambia
Lozi people
Members of the National Assembly of Zambia
Patriotic Front (Zambia) politicians
People from Senanga District
Santa Monica College alumni
United Party for National Development politicians
University of Zambia alumni
Vice-presidents of Zambia
Women government ministers of Zambia
Women vice presidents